James Callaghan (28 January 1927 – 29 March 2018) was a British Labour Party politician who was a member of parliament between 1974 and 1997.

Early life
Callaghan was educated at Manchester and London universities, and he worked as a lecturer in art at St John's College, Manchester, before entering Parliament.

Political career
At the February 1974 general election, Callaghan was elected as the member of parliament (MP) for Middleton and Prestwich. He served this constituency and its successor, Heywood and Middleton, until he retired in 1997. He was a member of several House of Commons Select Committees – on Transport, on the Cardiff Barrage scheme, and on Education, Science & the Arts.

He served as Parliamentary Private Secretary to Joel Barnett, the Chief Secretary to the Treasury. He was removed from this role in March 1976, after abstaining in a division on spending cuts which the Government lost, forcing a vote of confidence against Prime Minister Harold Wilson. He later also served as PPS to the Sports Minister Denis Howell.

He was a member of the Tribune Group of Labour MPs.

Death
Callaghan died on 29 March 2018 at the age of 91.

References

External links
 

1927 births
2018 deaths
Labour Party (UK) MPs for English constituencies
UK MPs 1974
UK MPs 1974–1979
UK MPs 1979–1983
UK MPs 1983–1987
UK MPs 1987–1992
UK MPs 1992–1997
Members of the Parliament of the United Kingdom for Heywood and Middleton